Augustin Melwyn Fernandes (born 13 October 1988) is an Indian professional footballer who plays as a centre back for Sudeva Delhi FC in the I-League.

Career
Born in Goa, Fernandes began his career with the Sesa Football Academy before signing a professional contract with I-League side Salgaocar in 2011. During his first season with the club, Fernandes helped Salgaocar win the I-League and Federation Cup titles.

In 2015, Fernandes was part of the Indian Super League Draft where he was selected in the second round by Atlético de Kolkata. After spending the 2015 season with Atlético on loan, Fernandes decided to join Pune City on loan for the 2016 ISL season.

On 23 July 2017, Fernandes was selected in the 12th round of the 2017–18 ISL Players Draft by ATK for the 2017–18 Indian Super League season. He was released by the club in January 2018 without making a single appearance for the side.

A year later, on 25 January 2019, Fernandes was signed by fellow Indian Super League club, Jamshedpur.

International
Fernandes made his international senior debut for India on 12 November 2015 in a 2018 FIFA World Cup qualifier against Guam. He came on as a 91st-minute substitute as India won 1–0. On 3 January 2016, Fernandes was in the starting line-up as India defeated Afghanistan in the 2015 SAFF Championship Final.

Honours

Club
Salgaocar
 I-League: 2010–11
 Federation Cup: 2011

International
India
SAFF Championship: 2015

References

External links 
 Indian Super League Profile

1988 births
Living people
People from Goa
Indian footballers
Salgaocar FC players
ATK (football club) players
FC Pune City players
Jamshedpur FC players
Association football defenders
Footballers from Goa
Goa Professional League players
I-League players
Indian Super League players
India international footballers
SESA Football Academy players
Sudeva Delhi FC players